Bramhall High School is a larger than average,  nine form entry, comprehensive high school for 11 to 16 year olds in Bramhall, Stockport, England.

The school is a teacher training school in connection with Manchester Metropolitan University in Manchester.

History
The school opened as Bramhall County Grammar School on Seal Road in 1967 as a co-educational three-form entry grammar school.

It became The Bramhall County High School in 1971 with a ten-form entry with a sixth form.  New buildings were added to prepare for the comprehensive intake.  Until April 1974 it was administered by Cheshire Education Committee.  By 1973 it had a 12-form entry with around 1400 pupils.

With the new LEA of Stockport, it became known as Bramhall High School in 1974.  In 1975 it was a 9-form entry school with around 300 in the sixth form, and again was 12-form entry in 1980.  Similar to Marple Hall School in Marple, the sixth form was closed in the early 1990s.  Since the introduction of academies under the educational reforms of Michael Gove a few secondary schools in Stockport have opened sixth form centres. Bramhall High School started the consultation process into opening a sixth form at the school, with the view of opening in September 2015.

Historic press coverage
The school came under the spotlight in 2002, when they asked parents of pupils to pay £10 per month to help following cuts in funding from Stockport Education Authority under the Labour government.

The school was initially criticised after the installation of unisex toilets in 2000, as a move to tackle bullying and smoking.  Subsequently, this development has become accepted Government policy, and the school features on the 'Bog Standard' website, was selected as a case study in good design by the Design Council and in 2007 was the subject of a follow-up documentary for the BBC Breakfast Programme.  The unisex toilets were segregated again in August 2013.

The school also was the focus of critical news headlines after it introduced sniffer dogs to search the school premises for traces of illegal drugs.

In March 2007, the school was in the news after banning traditional knotted ties from the school uniform and replacing them with clip-on ties.  A spokesperson for the school later declared that the move to introduce clip-on ties was "more about student appearance than health and safety".

OFSTED report
An OFSTED inspection in 2014 rated the school as "Requires improvement" in all categories. Following the previous OFSTED inspection (2010) the school had been described as "a good and improving school with some outstanding features."

In September 2019, the school was inspected again. The inspectors found all aspects to be "Good", or "Outstanding"- but before the inspection referred to the schools 2 year Key Stage 3 curriculum model as 'the elephant in the room'. Ofsted claimed that the requirements of the National Curriculum for a broad and balanced Key Stage 3 syllabus had not been met and repeated the "Requires improvement" judgement. Two months later a similar judgement depressed the judgement at Impington Village College and has caused other schools and academies to make adjustments to their curriculum model, and rewrite their curriculum intent.

Academic performance
The percentage of students gaining the top grades has reached the highest ever at 79.4%.  The percentage achieving English, maths and 5+ A* – C grades rose from last year's 65% to 66% (provisional with remarks pending).  At the same time the average points score per student rose by 13 points. This measure indicates students gaining (on average) the equivalent of an extra A* each compared with similar students in 2004.  80% of students achieved at least two C grades in science, and 118 students achieved C or better in 3 separate sciences.

Notable former pupils and staff
 Christine Bottomley, actress
 Richard Burden, former Labour MP for Birmingham Northfield
 Tina Cullen, hockey player
 Sacha Dhawan, actor
 Lauren Drummond, actress
 Daniel Ellis, professional footballer
 Keith Fielding, rugby league footballer (former teacher and deputy headteacher)
 Yvette Fielding, television presenter
 Martin Fry, lead singer with 1980s new romantic band ABC
 Esther Hall, television actor
 Owen Jones, writer
 Harriet Mills, England rugby union International
 Natalie Pike, Model/Broadcaster
 Graeme Smith, swimmer
 Ben Spencer, rugby union player
 Kelly Wenham, actress
 Hannah Whelan, Olympic gymnast
 Aaron Geramipoor, basketball player

References
 Guardian, 29 January 1974, page 20

External links
 Bramhall High
 EduBase

Secondary schools in the Metropolitan Borough of Stockport
Educational institutions established in 1967
1967 establishments in England
Community schools in the Metropolitan Borough of Stockport
Training schools in England